Chrysactinia lehtoae, is a Mexican species of flowering plants in the family Asteraceae. It is native to northwestern Mexico, found only in pine-oak forests in northern Sinaloa

Chrysactinia lehtoae is a small, branching, evergreen subshrub up to 30 cm (12 inches) tall. Leaves are pinnately lobed. Flower heads have yellow ray flowers and yellow-green  disc flowers.

References

Flora of Sinaloa
Tageteae
Plants described in 1976